Wheelchair fencing at the 2012 Summer Paralympics was held in the ExCeL from 4 September to 8 September 2012.

Classification
Fencers were given a classification depending on the type and extent of their disability. The classification system allows fencers to compete against others with a similar level of function. Fencing has two classes, A and B. Wheelchairs were anchored to the ground during competition.

Participating nations
105 fencers from 24 nations took part in this sport.

Medal summary

Medal table

Events
The five event types below were competed for both class A and class B, for a total of ten events.

Men's épée
Men's foil
Men's sabre
Women's épée
Women's foil

Men's events

Women's events

References

 
2012
Paralympics
2012 Summer Paralympics events
International fencing competitions hosted by the United Kingdom